The 2003 Sandwell Metropolitan Borough Council election took place on 1 May 2003 to elect members of Sandwell Metropolitan Borough Council in the West Midlands, England. One third of the council was up for election and the Labour Party stayed in overall control of the council.

After the election, the composition of the council was:
Labour 55
Conservative 9
Liberal Democrat 6
British National Party 2

Campaign
Before the election the Labour party held control of the council with 57 seats, while the Conservatives had 8 seats and the Liberal Democrats 6 seats. A further seat was vacant in Great Bridge ward after the death of Labour councillor Jean Marson. 24 seats were being contested in the election by a total of 83 candidates. Labour was defending 20 of the 24 seats, with the mayor and 5 members of the cabinet among those contesting the election. The Conservatives contested every seat, the Socialist Labour Party stood in 15 seats, Liberal Democrats 10, British National Party 5 and there were 2 candidates from the Freedom Party.

The candidates from the British National Party and the Freedom Party caused controversy, with the UNISON trade union calling on its members to vote against them and boycott any councillors from those parties. A local Labour Member of Parliament Tom Watson meanwhile said that property prices would fall if any candidates from the British National Party were elected.

Election result
The results saw the British National Party win 2 seats on the council for the first time. The British National Party's John Salvage gained Princes End by 37 votes and David Watkins took Great Bridge by nearly 100 votes. Meanwhile, Labour held control of the council despite dropping seats. The Conservatives gained 1 seat, while the Liberal Democrats stayed on 6 seats.

The first council meeting following the election on 20 May saw a protest by union members against the presence of a British National Party councillor.

Ward results

References

2003 English local elections
2003
2000s in the West Midlands (county)